Sugar glass (also called candy glass, edible glass, and breakaway glass) is a brittle transparent form of sugar that looks like glass. It can be formed into a sheet that looks like flat glass or an object, such as a bottle or drinking glass.

Description
Sugar glass is made by dissolving sugar in water and heating it to at least the "hard crack" stage (approx. 150 °C / 300 °F) in the candy making process.  Glucose or corn syrup is used to prevent the sugar from recrystallizing, by getting in the way of the sugar molecules forming crystals. Cream of tartar also helps by turning the sugar into glucose and fructose.

Because sugar glass is hygroscopic, it must be used soon after preparation, or it will soften and lose its brittle quality.

Sugar glass has been used to simulate glass in movies, photographs, plays and professional wrestling.

Other uses 
Sugar glass is also used to make sugar sculptures or other forms of edible art.

Sugar glass was used as a prop for methamphetamine in the AMC TV series Breaking Bad. Actor Aaron Paul would eat it on set.

Also, professional wrestling uses sugar glass in spots.

References

Amorphous solids
Sugar confectionery
Glass types
Stunts